Dysaphis karyakini is a species of aphid found near Luvenga, Murmansk province, Russia. It was named in honor of Russian ornithologist A. S. Koryakin (1954–2014). The species was described in 2018.

References

Macrosiphini
Insects of Russia
Insects described in 2018